Stephen Rousseas (January 11, 1921 – February 1, 2012) was the Dexter M. Ferry, Jr. Emeritus Professor of Economics at Vassar College. He has also taught at Cornell University, Columbia University, New York University, the University of Michigan and Yale University.

Born in Scranton, Pennsylvania, he was a Columbia graduate, earning a bachelor's degree in 1948 and a PhD in 1954. He was a friend of Andreas Papandreou and active in American organizations supporting Papandreou after the 1967 coup d'etat in Greece.

Bibliography
The Death of Democracy: Greece and the American Conscience, Monetary Theory
Capitalism and Catastrophe: A Critical Appraisal of the Limits of Capitalism
The Political Economy of Reaganomics: A Critique
Post Keynesian Monetary Economics

References 

1921 births
2012 deaths
American economists
American people of Greek descent
People from Scranton, Pennsylvania
Monetary economists
Columbia University alumni
Yale University faculty
University of Michigan faculty
New York University faculty
Cornell University faculty
Columbia University faculty
Vassar College faculty